Goat Girl is the debut eponymous studio album by English post-punk band Goat Girl. It was released on 6 April 2018, by Rough Trade Records.

The album charted at number 24 on the UK Official Albums Chart, and number 44 in Scotland.

Release
The first track to be released from the album "Country Sleaze" was released on 20 September 2016.

On 30 October 2017, Goat Girl announced the release of their second single "Cracker Drool". The single was produced by Dan Carey at his South London studio, while the music video was directed by CC Wade in Sussex, England.

On 6 February 2018, the band announced the released of their debut album, along with the single "The Man". The band said of the album: "Simply put, it’s an album that comes from growing up in London and the first-hand experience of our city’s devolution. We wanted to think of it as this place seen not necessarily just through our eyes, but someone who can’t get past the abnormalities and strange happenings that exist in our city. We think this gives the freedom lyrically and musically to explore unspoken truths and emotions that we all as humans feel."

Critical reception
Goat Girl was met with "generally favorable" reviews from critics. At Metacritic, which assigns a weighted average rating out of 100 to reviews from mainstream publications, this release received an average score of 80 based on 17 reviews. Aggregator Album of the Year gave the release a 78 out of 100 based on a critical consensus of 18 reviews.

Josh Gray from Clash said the album has "earworm guitar licks and choir-like harmonies sprout unexpectedly from Goat Girl’s skeletal, unpredictable songs like wildflowers in landfill. Detuned ragtime pianos sound through intervals like the echoes of a haunted carnival while disembodied voices tell ghoulish tales of a semi-mythical London that exists beneath the cobblestones, caked in dirt and disease and decay." Lisa Wright from DIY said the album is "ambitious and uncompromising, in both structure and content; rather than spoonfeeding, Goat Girl demand more from their listeners and provide more in tandem. As an opening statement, this is as gutsy and self-assured as they come." Cal Cashin from Dork gave high praise to the band for the songwriting and catchy melodies within the album, explaining "The ease at which a whole other world is created, and the amount of catchy and effortlessly cool melodies on the way, ensure that Goat Girl’s debut is not only accomplished, but special.

Accolades

Track listing

Personnel

Musicians
 Rosy Bones – drums
 Ellie Rose Davies – guitar, vocals
 Clottie Cream – guitar, vocals
 Naima Jelly – bass, backing vocals
 Tina Longford – violin

Production
 Dan Carey – producer
 Christian Wright – mastering
 Alexis Smith – mixing

Charts

References

2018 debut albums
Rough Trade Records albums